This article contains an overview of the sport of athletics, including track and field, cross country and road running, in the year 2004.

The major competition of the year was the 2004 Summer Olympics. At the event, Yelena Isinbayeva cleared a world record 4.91 m in the pole vault. Liu Xiang won the men's 110 metres hurdles with a world record-equalling time of 12.91 seconds, defying traditional beliefs about the physical calibre of Chinese (and Asian) sprint athletes. Hicham El Guerrouj capped off his prominent international career with two gold medals in the 1500 m and 5000 m. The Olympic competition in Athens was marred by an incident involving Greek Olympic medallists Konstantinos Kenteris and Ekaterini Thanou, who were alleged to have staged a motorcycle crash in order to avoid doping tests. Both athletes missed the competition and were later banned for missing three doping tests.

Major events

World

Olympic Games
Summer Paralympics
World Indoor Championships
World Athletics Final
World Cross Country Championships
World Half Marathon Championships
World Race Walking Cup
IAAF Golden League

Regional

African Championships
Asian Indoor Championships
Asian Cross Country Championships
Pan Arab Games
South Asian Games
Balkan Games
European Cross Country Championships
European Cup
European Mountain Running Championships
Ibero-American Championships

World records

Men

Women

Season's bests

Awards

Men

Women

Seasonal rankings by event

Men

400 m Hurdles

3000 m Steeplechase

Marathon

Pole Vault

Hammer Throw

Decathlon

Women

100 metres

200 metres

Half Marathon

100 m Hurdles

400 m Hurdles

3000 m Steeplechase

High Jump

Pole Vault

Hammer Throw

Heptathlon

Marathon

Deaths
 April 23 – Manuel Alcalde (47), Spanish race walker (b. 1956)
 December 4 – June Maston (76), Australian sprinter and athletics coach (b. 1928)
 December 25 – Ian Syster (28), South African long-distance runner (b. 1976)

References

Marathon times
 ARRS

 
Athletics (track and field) by year